Conception commonly refers to:

 Concept, an abstract idea or a mental symbol
 Conception (biology), the process of becoming pregnant, involving fertilization and implantation of the embryo in the uterus

Conception may also refer to:

Entertainment 
 Conception (album), an album by Miles Davis
 "Conception" (song), a 1950 jazz standard by George Shearing
 Conception, a posthumous album by Bill Evans
 Conception (band), a Norwegian band
 Conception (film), a 2011 film
 Conception (video game), a 2012 role-playing video game developed by Spike
 Conception (anime), a 2018 anime TV series adaptation of the same video game
 Conception II: Children of the Seven Stars, a 2013 RPG video game also by Spike

Maritime 
 Sinking of MV Conception, a 2019 fire and sinking of a dive boat

Places 
 Conception, Missouri, US
 Conception, Minnesota, US
 Conception Bay, Newfoundland, Canada
 Conception Bay (Namibia)

See also 
 Concept (disambiguation)
 Concepción (disambiguation)
 Conception Island (disambiguation)